The EHF Champions League 2007–08 was the 2007-2008 edition of the EHF Champions League who is managed by EHF.

Qualification round

Group round

Group A

Group B

Group C

Group D

Group E

Group F

Group G

Group H

Main round

Group 1

Group 2

Group 3

Group 4

Semi-finals

Final

Top scorers
The top scorers from the 2007–08 EHF Champions League are as follows:

 
C
C
EHF Champions League seasons